Paul Kalas (born August 13, 1967) is a Greek American astronomer known for his discoveries of debris disks around stars.  Kalas led a team of scientists to obtain the first visible-light images of an extrasolar planet with orbital motion around the star Fomalhaut, at a distance of 25 light years from Earth.   The planet is referred to as Fomalhaut b.

Background

Kalas was born in New York City to George Kavallinis and Maria Drettakis, who immigrated to the United States from Heraklion, Crete.  Kalas attended Detroit Country Day School in Michigan, and studied astronomy and physics at the University of Michigan, Ann Arbor.  He earned a Ph.D. in Astronomy in 1996 from the University of Hawaii under the direction of astronomer David Jewitt.

Kalas worked as a postdoctoral scientist at the Max Planck Institute for Astronomy in Heidelberg, Germany, the Space Telescope Science Institute, and the University of California, Berkeley.  In 2006, he became an Adjunct Professor of Astronomy at the University of California, Berkeley.

Kalas lives with his wife Aspasia Gkika and daughters Maria-Nikoleta and Natalia near Berkeley, California.

Discoveries

Kalas discovered several circumstellar disks using a coronagraph on the Hubble Space Telescope and at the University of Hawaii 2.2-meter telescope at Mauna Kea, Hawaii.  In 1995 he discovered various forms of asymmetric structures in optical images of the Beta Pictoris disk. He was the lead scientist for the first optical images of debris disks surrounding the nearby red dwarf AU Microscopii and the bright star Fomalhaut.
  
Kalas' Hubble Space Telescope image of Fomalhaut revealed a narrow belt of dusty material analogous to our Solar System's Kuiper Belt.  However, Kalas also found that Fomalhaut's belt is narrow and geometrically offset from the star by 15 astronomical units. These features are considered strong evidence for an extrasolar planet orbiting Fomalhaut that gravitationally sculpts the morphology of the belt.

Honors

 Elected Fellow of the American Association for the Advancement of Science (2014)
 AIAA William H. Pickering Lecture (2010)
 Newcomb Cleveland Prize of the American Association for the Advancement of Science (2009)

Selected publications

Articles

Books

References

External links 
 The Circumstellar Disk Learning Site
 Kalas' homepage
 Sky & Telescope Article on Fomalhaut discovery
 Space.com article on AU Microscopii discovery
 New Scientist article on HD 53143 and HD 139664 discoveries

American astronomers
American people of Greek descent
1967 births
Living people
University of California, Berkeley faculty
University of Michigan College of Literature, Science, and the Arts alumni
University of Hawaiʻi alumni
Detroit Country Day School alumni
20th-century Greek Americans
20th-century Greek astronomers